New Covenant can mean:
 New Covenant, a core theological concept in Christianity
 New Covenant (politics), a political slogan and concept from the Clinton presidency in US politics
 New Covenant Theology, a particular theological view in Christianity of redemptive history comparable to Covenant theology and Dispensationalism
 New Testament, the second major division of Christian scripture